Colette "Coco" Kaminski (born 29 May 1997) is an American figure skater, who represented internationally Poland between 2013 and 2017. She is a three time Polish national bronze medalist.

Personal life
Kaminski was born in the US, as a fourth child, on 29 May 1997 from American mother and Polish father. Her sister was also a figure skater.  As of spring 2017, she was a student at The George Washington University in Washington, D.C.

Career
Kaminski started skating in 2004, under Judy Johnson Bouts. Not being strong enough to represent the US, she was invited in 2013 to skate for Poland.

Programs

Competitive highlights
JGP: Junior Grand Prix; CS: Challenger Series

External links

Colette Coco Kaminski at the Polish Figure Skating Association
Colette Coco Kaminski at Stats on Ice

References

1997 births
Living people
American people of Polish descent
Polish female single skaters
Polish sportswomen
Sportspeople from Minnesota
American female single skaters